The  is an archaeological site containing late Heian to early Kamakura period kilns located in the Mutsure neighborhood of the city of Tahara, Aichi in the Tōkai region of Japan. It was designated as a National Historic Site in 1922.

Overview
The Dodo Sue Ware Kiln was a Sue ware pottery production site approximately four kilometers southeast of the modern city center of Tahara, in a hilly forest. After World War II, many ruins of kilns have been discovered in the Atsumi Peninsula dating from the late Heian period to the early Kamakura period, thus shedding light on the origins of several styles of pottery which until that time were uncertain. The Dodo site contains two nobori-gama kilns built side-by-side on a hill, utilizing a south-facing slope. These kilns were used to produce everyday items, such as small bowls, plates, tea cups, etc. 

The site is located approximately 18 minutes by car from Toyohashi Railroad Atsumi Line Mikawa-Tahara Station.

See also
List of Historic Sites of Japan (Aichi)

References

External links
Tahara Museum home page 

History of Aichi Prefecture
Tahara, Aichi
Historic Sites of Japan
Archaeological sites in Japan
Japanese pottery kiln sites
Mikawa Province